Tuan is a coastal rural town and locality in the Fraser Coast Region, Queensland, Australia.

Geography 
Big Tuan Creek forms the southern boundary of the locality while Little Tuan Creek bounds the locality to the north. The shore of the Great Sandy Strait bounds the locality to the east. The town is situated on the eastern shore.

History 
The town name takes its name for an Aboriginal word from a Sydney dialect meaning brush tailed phascogale.

Education 
There are no schools in Tuan. The nearest primary schools are in Maryborough and its suburbs. The nearest secondary school is in Maryborough.

References 

Towns in Queensland
Fraser Coast Region
Coastline of Queensland
Localities in Queensland